Corystospermaceae is a natural family of seed ferns (Pteridospermatophyta) also called Umkomasiaceae, and first based on fossils collected by Hamshaw Thomas from the Burnera Waterfall locality near the Umkomaas River of South Africa. Corystosperms are typified by a group of plants that bore Dicroidium leaves, Umkomasia ovulate structures and Pteruchus pollen organs, that were widespread over Gondwana during the Triassic period. Other fossil Mesozoic seed plants with similar reproductive structures have also sometimes been included within the concept, such as the "doyleoids" from the Early Cretaceous of North America and Asia. A potential corystosperm, the leaf fossil Komlopteris cenozoicus, is known from the Eocene of Tasmania, at least 13 million years after the Cretaceous–Paleogene extinction event.

Description
Umkomasiaceae have helmet-like cupules around ovules born in complex large branching structures (Umkomasia).
The pollen organ (Pteruchus) has numerous cigar-shaped pollen sacs hanging from epaulette-like blades, again in complex branching structures. 

The leaves (Dicroidium) are tied to the fertile organs by similarities of cuticular structure, because their cuticles were robust like those of gymnosperms and unlike the thin leaves of ferns.

See also
 Evolution of plants

References

External links

Pteridospermatophyta
Permian plants
Triassic plants
Prehistoric plant families
Permian first appearances
Triassic extinctions